Keren Pevzner (née Kira Gennadievna Konovalova; born May 8, 1961 in Baku, Azerbaijan SSR) who also goes by the pen name Katerina Vrublevskaya as vintage crime fictions author, is an Israeli novel and essay writer, Hebrew and computer science teacher, translator, author of a number of textbooks, cookbooks, and encyclopedias, and blogger.

Biography 
Kira Konovalova was born on May 8, 1961, in Baku. She comes from an old family of Bakuvian oil engineers. Her great grandfathers were European specialists (the Jews and the Germans) who participated in the conducted by Branobel Caspian oil-field development, at the invitation of Zeynalabdin Taghiyev. One of them, Johann (Ivan Aleksandrovich) Maderwax worked together with a German mining engineer Gustav Wilhelm Richard Sorge, the father of renowned soviet spy Richard Sorge. Later, he took a job with the Caspian Steamship Company. In 1938, he fell victim of the Great Purge (Stalinists repressions) and was executed.

Kira attended the 20th Secondary School in Baku, then she went to Azerbaijan State Oil and Industry University where earlier have studied her grandmother and both parents, and graduated with a specialty of Electrical Engineer. After graduation, she was taking a position in the AzerElectroTherm Research and Production Association.

Keren repatriated to Israel in 1990, together with her second husband and her eldest son. She tried her hand at a great number of trades from a kibbutz worker and grocery store owner to Hebrew language teaching and employment with the Ministry of Absorption Israel. Currently, she resides in Ashkelon, and as her primary occupation engages in teaching at the Сollege of Computer science for public jobholders in Israel. Additionally, Keren busies herself with educational literature writing and publishing.

As a delegate, she was present at the Conference of the Azerbaijan-Israel Friendship Society.

From 2008, Keren writes the "Culinary commentary" column on Booknik, the Web resource and publication in Russian on Jewish literature and culture.

Under the pen name "Kirulya of Ashkelon" is blogging on LiveJournal.

She also has a blog on TikTok.

Keren has two sons and two granddaughters.

Works 
According to her own story, Keren undertook her first attempts in writing at around eight years old.

Keren Pevzner's first published book (1997, Miry Publishing Company) was The Parallel Ulpan, a Hebrew self-teaching guide in two volumes. She wrote it for two years on the suggestion from the writer Daniel Kluger who has attended her course. This book effectively carved out a niche of textbooks for self-teaching written in plain language for Russian-speaking repatriates (afterward, as well as for Hebrew self-study in Diaspora, for example in Russia and in Canada), and ever since it went through eleven editions at least.

Keren's first work of fiction was a crime story, The Murderer's Confession.

Cumulative bibliography

Fictional Works

Crime Fictions 

Crime fiction series of Valeriya Vishnevskaya (were published in Iskatel and Iskatel's World Magazines):
 the novel, The Murderer's Confession (Исповедь убийцы) — Iskatel Magazine, 3-1999.
 the story, The Real Estate Tax (Налог на недвижимость) — Iskatel's World Magazine, 6-1999.
 the story, The Purely Jewish Murder (Чисто еврейское убийство) — Iskatel Magazine, 10-1999.
 the story, The Pilgrim's Death (Смерть пилигрима) — Iskatel Magazine, 1-2000.
 the story, The Saxofonist's Death (Смерть саксофониста) — Iskatel's World Magazine № 4 за 2000 год.
 the story, Her Last Cruise (Её последний круиз) — Iskatel's World Magazine № 10 за 2001 год.
 the story, The Lamp of Pharaoh (Светильник фараона) — Iskatel Magazine № 2 за 2004 год.
 the story, Seeking Out/In Search of a Golem (В поисках Голема) — (2004).

Vintage Crime Fiction Novels of Apollinariya Avilova 
 The Apollinariya Aviliva's First Case (Первое дело Аполлинарии Авиловой) — Prosodiya Publishing Company (2002, 50.000 copies). Later, the novel was reissued in Book Club 36,6 Publishing Company in Crime Fiction by Woman’s Pen series (2005, 5.000 copies).
 The Case of Lost/Vanished Talisman (Дело о пропавшем талисмане) — Prosodiya Publishing Company (2003, 50.000 copies). Reissued in Book Club 36,6 Publishing Company (2006, 5.000 copies).
 The Case of Antique Portrait (Дело о старинном портрете) — Book Club 36,6 Publishing Company (2006, 5.000 copies).
 The Case of Rubies of Queen of Sheba (Дело о рубинах царицы Савской) — was issued together with the novel The Crown/Tiara of King Saitafern by Boris Vorobyov in World Classic series (Iskatel's World) in Iskatel Publishing Company (2006, 2700 copies). Later, the novel was issued in Ivrus Publishing (Tel Aviv, 2008).

Science Fiction 
 Windy City (Город Ветров) — Miry Publishing Company (Jerusalem, 2000).

Collections of op-ed essays 
 Notice to a Beginning Mistress/Concubine… and all sorts of odds and ends (Памятка начинающей любовнице… и всякая всячина)
 Keren Spins Yarns… (Studies of Life, Love, and Faraway Lands) (Керен рассказывает… (этюды о жизни, любви и дальних странах))

Books of Specialized Subjects
(by default, all the books were issued by SeferIsrael, Tel Aviv)

Hebrew and Israeli records management textbooks, phrasebooks, language for specific purposes/subject oriented/specialized dictionaries (Russian↔Hebrew)

 Self-teaching textbook The Parallel Ulpan (Параллельный ульпан),  — the original edition of 1997. It went through eleven editions at least. Since the third edition, was enhanced with the second volume in the form of reading-book under the editorship of Prof. . The total print is 22.000 copies at least.
 May I Ask (Позвольте спросить) phrasebook — Miry Publishing Company (1998), reissued by SeferIsrael in 2003 and 2009.
 The Mini Sihon (Mini Сихон) phrasebook (2004)
 The Super Sihon (Super Сихон) phrasebook under the editorship of A.Solomonik; by the year 2009 went through six editions.
 The Electrician Dictionary (2010)
 The Programmer Dictionary (2010)
 The Accountant Modern Dictionary
 The Musical Dictionary
 Please Meet the FORM (practical suggestions/tips) (two issues in 2002 and 2010)
 Please Meet the FORM (practical suggestions/tips) (two issues)
 Microsoft WORD In Hebrew And In Russian (2012)

The Popular Encyclopedies

 The Jewish Names (2002)
 Israeli Fish Dishes (2007) 
 The Israel Healthful And Kitchen Herbs encyclopedia (seven issues)
 Israeli Salads (three issues)
 Israeli Juices (2009)
 How They Eat in Israel? (Как едят в Израиле?) (2010) — the collection of essays originally published at the «Booknik»

References

External links

Book Reviews

Interviews
 
 
 

1961 births
20th-century Israeli women writers
21st-century Israeli women writers
People from Ashkelon
Israeli people of Azerbaijani-Jewish descent
Azerbaijan State Oil and Industry University alumni
Israeli bloggers
Israeli women bloggers
Israeli educators
Israeli women educators
Israeli opinion journalists
Israeli women journalists
Israeli food writers
Israeli crime fiction writers
Women cookbook writers
Women food writers
Israeli translators
Detective fiction writers
Russian-language writers
Living people